Sorry (previously named Fish) is an English indie rock band from North London. The band consists of the members Asha Lorenz, Louis O'Bryen, Lincoln Barrett, Campbell Baum and Marco Pini. The band's debut studio album, 925 (2020), was released following the release of several mixtapes and singles. Sorry is signed to London-based record label Domino.

History

Forming and first releases 
Before embarking as a group of five members, the band consisted of only Lorenz and O'Bryen. They had known each other from an early age and during their GCSE years, they started releasing solo music projects on SoundCloud, competing with each other regarding who of the two that could make the best songs. Later on, they realized they worked better together and therefore started to create music as a pair, mostly Jimi Hendrix covers at the time. Even though the band now consist of more members than just Lorenz and O'Bryen, they have stated that the other members are mostly present when they are doing live performances. O'Bryen has said that "Well, we're [Sorry's] kind of a duo in the way we write songs, but the live thing is more a band." Sorry released a handful of singles and mixtapes during the years 2017–2020, containing many of the songs that later would appear on its debut studio album.

Debut studio album and upcoming tour 
On 27 March 2020, Sorry released its debut studio album, 925. It contains the previously released singles "More", "Right Round the Clock", "Snakes" and "Starstruck". Reportedly, it took four years to record and received positive reviews from music critics at its release, many of whom particularly praised the album's cohesiveness and its innovative sound. Stereogum also called 925 album of the week on 24 March 2020. However, Kitty Empire of The Guardian gave the album a mixed review, stating that "925 packs in more than a few disruptive ideas. But Sorry haven't yet acquired the musical vocabulary to pull them off." The album charted on the UK Independent Albums Chart and peaked at number 13 as well as the Scottish Albums Chart, peaking at number 49. The band planned to embark on a UK headline tour to promote the album's release, but postponed the tour dates due to the COVID-19 pandemic.

In February 2021, Sorry announced a live album recorded at the South London Windmill Brixton venue, with proceeds going towards the venue, it having faced financial difficulties in the wake of the COVID-19 pandemic.

Anywhere But Here
On 12 July 2022 Sorry announced their second album Anywhere But Here out October 7 on Domino Records, alongside the release of its first single "Let the Lights On". The album was recorded with Portishead's Adrian Utley.

Genres 
Multiple publications have stated that Sorry's specific musical style and genre is difficult to define. Matty Pywell of GigWise stated that "Listening to Sorry's discography is to hear a safari of different sounds, as eye catching as the next. One area might contain the grumbled discontent of punk and rock, whilst if you look close enough you can catch a flash of hip-hop and jazz. Grouping them into a single genre is a fool's errand". Lorenz and O'Bryen have themselves talked about their genre in music, describing it as pop music, while Lorenz has stated that "It's just a bit annoying to be called post punk or grunge because I don't think we are that." The Guardian has stated that "A typical Sorry track is just as likely to be inflected with 90s grunge as with jazz or trip-hop", therefore deeming Sorry's genre in music as diverse.

Discography 
Adapted from Spotify.

Albums

Studio Albums

Live Albums

Mixtapes

Singles

References

English indie rock groups